Alex Singleton (born November 7, 1989) is a former American football fullback. He played college football at Tulsa where he was a running back. He was signed as an undrafted free agent by the Oakland Raiders in 2013.

Professional career

Oakland Raiders
After going undrafted during the 2013 NFL Draft, Singleton attended camp at the Oakland Raiders. After participating in rookie mini-camp, he was let go.

Arizona Rattlers
On January 2, 2014, Singleton was assigned to the Arizona Rattlers of the Arena Football League (AFL).

References

External links
 Tulsa Bio
 Arena Football League Bio

1989 births
Living people
American football fullbacks
Tulsa Golden Hurricane football players
Arizona Rattlers players
Players of American football from Louisiana
Oakland Raiders players